Patrasayer railway station is a railway station of Bankura–Masagram line under the Adra railway division of South Eastern Railway zone. It is situated beside Kankar Danga–Rasulpur Chati Road at Patrasayer in Bankura district in the Indian state of West Bengal.

History 
In 2005, the 118 kilometers long railway section known as Bankura–Masagram line was converted to  broad gauge. The whole track including Patrasayer railway station was electrified in 2018–19.

References

Railway stations in Bankura district
Adra railway division
Railway stations opened in 1916
1916 establishments in India